NGC 3675 is a spiral galaxy located in the constellation Ursa Major. It is located at a distance of circa 50 million light years from Earth, which, given its apparent dimensions, means that NGC 3675 is about 100,000 light years across. It was discovered by William Herschel in 1788.

It hosts a low-ionization nuclear emission-line region (LINER).  In the nucleus there is a supermassive black hole with an estimated mass of 10-39 million , based on the intrinsic velocity dispersion as measured by the Hubble Space Telescope. Although the galaxy was reported to have a strong bar visible in infrared images, there has been no indication of a bar in further observations. Its spiral disk is of type III and there is a dust structure which is more prominent to the east. The galaxy features two ring structures, with diameter 1.62 and 2.42 arcminutes. The spiral arms are tightly wound and form an inner pseudoring and they continue for one revolution outside the ring. The outer arms are very patchy and filamentary.

One supernova has been observed in NGC 3675, SN 1984R. NGC 3675 belongs to the Ursa Major Cluster, part of the Virgo Supercluster.

Gallery

References

External links 

Unbarred spiral galaxies
Ursa Major (constellation)
3675
06439
35164